A water spirit is a kind of supernatural being found in the folklore of many cultures:

African 

Some water spirits in traditional African religion include:
 Mami Wata is a transcultural pantheon of water spirits and deities of the African diaspora. For the many names associated with Mami Wata spirits and goddess, see Names of Mami Wata.
 Owu Mmiri of some riverine people of Nigeria are often described as mermaid-like spirit of water. 
 A jengu (plural miengu) is a water spirit in the traditional beliefs of the Sawa ethnic groups of Cameroon, particularly the Duala, Bakweri, and related Sawa peoples. Among the Bakweri, the name is liengu (plural: maengu).
 A simbi is a mermaid-like or reptilian spirits from Kongo tribe and related to Vaudou religion.

Celtic 
In Celtic mythology:
 An Each uisge is a particularly dangerous "water horse" supposed to be found in Scotland; its Irish counterpart is the Aughisky.
 The Gwragedd Annwn are female Welsh lake fairies of great beauty.
 A Kelpie is a less dangerous sort of water horse. There are many similar creatures by other names in the mythology including:
 the tangie (Orkney and Shetland)
 the nuggle also known as the shoopiltee or njogel (Shetland)
 the cabbyl-ushtey (Isle of Man)
 the Ceffyl Dŵr (Wales)
 the capaill uisce or the glashtin (Ireland)
 Morgens, Morgans or Mari-Morgans are Welsh and Breton water spirits that drown men.
 Selkie

Germanic 
In Germanic mythology:
 The Nixie (English) or the Nix/Nixe/Nyx (German) are shapeshifting water spirits who usually appear in human form
 The Undine or Ondine is a female water elemental (first appearing the alchemical works of Paracelsus)
 Jenny Greenteeth in the folklore of Lancashire
 Peg Powler said to inhabit the River Tees in Yorkshire
 The grindylow in the folklore of both Lancashire and Yorkshire.\

Ancient Greek... 
In Greek mythology:
 Naiads were nymphs who presided over fountains, wells, springs, streams, and brooks
 Crinaeae (Κρηναῖαι) were a type of nymph associated with fountains
 Limnades or Leimenides (Λιμνάδες / Λειμενίδες) were a type of naiad living in freshwater lakes.
 Pegaeae (Πηγαῖαι) were a type of naiad that lived in springs.
 Nereids were sea nymphs.
 Sirens were bird-bodied women living in the sea near a rocky island coastline.

Japanese 
In Japanese folklore:
 A  is a hair-covered version of a Kappa.

Mesoamerican 
In Aztec belief:
 Ahuizotl; a dog-like aquatic creature that drowned the unwary.

Oceanic 
In the mythology of Oceania:
 Adaro were malevolent merman-like sea spirits found in the mythology of the Solomon Islands.

Roman 
In Roman mythology:
 Camenae were goddesses of springs, wells and fountains, or water nymphs of Venus (mythology).

Slavic 

In Slavic mythology:
 A Vodyanoy (also wodnik, vodník, vodnik, vodenjak) is a male water spirit akin to the Germanic Neck.
 A Rusalka (plural: rusalki) was a female ghost, water nymph, succubus or mermaid-like demon that dwelled in a waterway.
 А Berehynia in ancient Ukrainian folklore is a goddess spirit that guarded the edges of waterways, while today it is used as a symbol for Ukrainian nationalism.
 Moryana is a giant sea spirit from Russian folklore. 
 For potoplenyk, vila/wila/wili/veela, and vodianyk, see also Slavic fairies.

Thai
Phi Phraya (ผีพราย, พรายน้ำ), a ghost living in the water.
Phi Thale (ผีทะเล), a spirit of the sea. It manifests itself in different ways, one of them being St. Elmo's fire, among other uncanny phenomenons experienced by sailors and fishermen while on boats.

References

Water spirits